Pendleton Historic District in Pendleton, South Carolina is a historic district which is located mostly in Anderson County, South Carolina and partly in Pickens County, South Carolina.
 The district was listed on the National Register of Historic Places in 1970. The historic district includes the town of Pendleton and its immediate surroundings plus a large tract west towards Lake Hartwell to include the Hopewell Keowee Monument and the Treaty Oak Monument.

It includes Woodburn, Ashtabula, and Old Stone Church and Cemetery, which are listed individually on the National Register.

External links
 Farmers Hall Historical Marker
 Hunter's Store Historical Marker
 Pendleton Historical Marker

References

National Register of Historic Places in Anderson County, South Carolina
National Register of Historic Places in Pickens County, South Carolina
Historic districts on the National Register of Historic Places in South Carolina
Historic American Buildings Survey in South Carolina
Buildings and structures in Anderson County, South Carolina
Buildings and structures in Pickens County, South Carolina